Iris Verhoek (born 12 September 2001) is a Dutch singer who won the 6th season of The Voice Kids in 2017.

Biography 
In 2011 Verhoek had already won the Zeewoldse kidssongfestival and played Keesie in the musical Kruimeltje. In 2012 musicalproducer Albert Verlinde announced that Verhoek was going to be playing one of the leading players in the musical Annie.

When Iris was twelve years old, she participated in The Voice Kids season 3. She didn't make it into the finals. In 2017 she participated in The Voice Kids again. 21 April 2017 she won the finals. Her first single Battlecry, was released 13 October 2017 .

References

2001 births
Living people
Dutch pop singers
21st-century Dutch singers